Ancistrus ranunculus is a species of catfish in the family Loricariidae. It is native to South America, where it occurs in the basins of the Xingu River and the Tocantins River in Brazil. It inhabits areas with clear water and without strong currents, and it is known to inhabit narrow cracks in submerged rocks, small passages, and spaces below flat rocks. The species is large for a member of Ancistrus, reaching 19.5 cm (7.7 inches) in total length. It sometimes appears in the aquarium trade, where it is one of several species known as a medusa pleco, although it may be referred to by its L-number, L034.

References 

ranunculus
Fish described in 1994
Catfish of South America